Bunch Creek is a stream in Placer County, California, United States.  Bunch Creek is a tributary to the North Fork of the American River, which confluence is to the east at  elevation.  In reaching that confluence, Brush Creek flows through Bunch Canyon.  The water quality in Bunch Creek is characterized by low turbidity, and is free of odor; trout were being caught in the creek according to a 1989 survey.(Earth Metrics, 1989)

History
The history of the town of Colfax, California is intertwined with Bunch Creek.  During the Gold Rush of the mid-19th century, miners and trappers of this part of Placer County found a place along Bunch Creek that was generally below the snow line; this place became known as Illinoistown. With the passage of time, and the increase in gold mining activities, the camp grew. It became a village with a general store, saloons, freight company and even a brothel.(Colfax, 2005) This settlement later became known as Colfax.

Notes
Colfax, California History (2005)
 Earth Metrics Inc, "Phase I Environmental Site Assessment, Bunch Creek Shopping Center, Colfax, California", printed in San Mateo, Ca., Document File Number 7928W0, May 16, 1989

See also
Placer mining

Rivers of Placer County, California
American River (California)
Colfax, California
Rivers of the Sierra Nevada in California
Rivers of Northern California